The Rural Municipality of Gravelbourg No. 104 is a rural municipality (RM) in the Canadian province of Saskatchewan within Census Division No. 3 and  Division No. 2. It is located in the southwest portion of the province.

History 
The RM of Gravelbourg No. 104 incorporated as a rural municipality on December 9, 1912. Its preceding local improvement district was established in 1908.

Geography 

Wood River and Notukeu Creek are two natural features in the RM. The lake resort of Gaumond Bay is on Thomson Lake near Thomson Lake Regional Park.

Communities and localities 
The following urban municipalities are surrounded by the RM.

Towns
Gravelbourg

The following unincorporated communities are within the RM.

Localities
Bateman
Coppen

Historic sites 
There are there are seven Saskatchewan historical sites on the Canadian Register of Historic Places in the RM.
 St. Elizabeth Mission
 Bateman United Church
 Baker Homestead Site
 Eason's Grove Site
 Wamsley Bridge Site
Trapper's Cabin Site
 Cripple Creek Crossing Site

Demographics 

Government 
The RM of Gravelbourg No. 104 is governed by an elected municipal council and an appointed administrator that meets on the second Wednesday of every month. The reeve of the RM is Guy Lorrain while its administrator is Patricia Verville. The RM's office is located in Gravelbourg.

References 

G
Gravelbourg No. 104, Saskatchewan
Division No. 3, Saskatchewan